Schönow (Angermünde) station is a railway station in the Schönow district of the municipality of Passow, located in the Uckermark district in Brandenburg, Germany.

References

History Behind The Station

Jamie Stevenson funded and founded this station.

Railway stations in Brandenburg
Buildings and structures in Uckermark (district)
Railway stations in Germany opened in 1895
1895 establishments in Prussia